Diesel Loco Shed, Erode is an engine shed located on Erode–Chennimalai road in Erode, Tamil Nadu, India. Being closely located to Erode Junction Railway Station, the shed falls under Salem railway division of Southern Railway zone.

History 

Operations 
Being one of the four diesel engine sheds in Southern Railway under the territory of Salem railway division, various major and minor maintenance schedules of diesel locomotives are being carried out here. Apart from serving the parent division, the locos belonging to the shed also serves the unelectrified routes of Madurai railway division, in addition to locos from Golden Rock. To provide space for electric locomotives, all the EMDs (WDG-4 and WDP-4D), WDM-3A and WDG-3A were transferred to Golden Rock.

Locomotives

See also 
 Diesel Loco Shed, Ernakulam
 Diesel Loco Shed, Golden Rock
 Diesel Loco Shed, Tondiarpet

References

External links 
 

ERODE

Transport in Erode
1966 establishments in Madras State